This is a list of all tornadoes that were confirmed by local offices of the National Weather Service in the United States in April 2009.

United States yearly total

April

Note: 2 tornadoes were confirmed in the final totals, but do not have a listed rating.

April 1 event

April 2 event

April 4 event

April 5 event

April 6 event

April 8 event

April 9 event

April 10 event

April 11 event

April 12 event

April 13 event

April 14 event

April 16 event

April 17 event

April 18 event

April 19 event

April 20 event

April 25 event

April 26 event

April 27 event

April 28 event

April 29 event

April 30 event

See also
Tornadoes of 2009

References

Tornadoes of 2009
2009, 04
April 2009 events in the United States